Gimo Air Base used to be a small military airport near the town of Gimo in Sweden. Today it is no longer used by the military and it is now known as Lunda Flygfält (Lunda Airfield). Of the 2,000 meters of runway only 800 meters now remains available for aircraft use. The airfield is most commonly used for various motorsport events, however aircraft are still allowed to use the airfield if prior permission is obtained from the operator.

Airports in Sweden